Starman, Star Men, or variation, may refer to:

People
 Space traveller
 "Starman", onstage alter ego of Kiss frontman Paul Stanley
 Starman (wrestler) (born 1974), Mexican professional wrestler

Places
 Starmen Point, Stresher Peninsula, Graham Coast, Antarctic Peninsula, Antarctica

Literature

Books
 StarMan (Sara Douglass novel), a 1996 fantasy novel by Sara Douglass
 The Starmen (1952 novel) U.S. science-fiction novel by Leigh Brackett
 Starman Jones, a novel by Robert A Heinlein

Comics 
 Starman (DC Comics), one of several comic book superheroes in the DC Comics universe. The most prominent are:
 Starman (Ted Knight), the first Starman, a 1940s superhero who wore a costume of red tights with a fin on his helmet, and wielded a "gravity rod" (later "cosmic rod") as a member of the Justice Society of America
 Starman (Jack Knight), the seventh Starman, a 1990s superhero and the younger son of the original
 Thom Kallor, also known as Star Boy of the Legion of Super-Heroes, is the current Starman and a member of the Justice Society of America

Film 
 Starman (film), a 1984 science fantasy film starring Jeff Bridges and Karen Allen
 Starman (TV series), 1986–87 television series (based on the 1984 movie of the same name), starring Robert Hays and Christopher Daniel Barnes
 Super Giant, a 1950s Japanese movie superhero, called "Starman" in America
 Star Men (2015 film) UK documentary following a roadtrip in the US Southwest by British astronomers

Music 
 Starman (band), a British pop band
 "Starman" (song), a 1972 song by David Bowie, talking about his alter ego Ziggy Stardust.
 Starman, an illustration associated with the Rush album 2112

Games 
 Star Man, a Robot Master featured in Mega Man 5
 Starman (Mario), a star-shaped power-up in the Mario series of video games
 Starman (EarthBound), an enemy in the EarthBound series of video games
 Starman, a wrestler in the Nintendo Entertainment System game Pro Wrestling
 Starman, a High-performance preforking PSGI/Plack web server
 Starmen.net, a fan website for 1995 video game EarthBound

Other uses 
 AS Starman, an Estonian cable television, VOIP telephony, and ISP company
 Starman, a mannequin dressed in a spacesuit seated on board  Elon Musk's Tesla Roadster that was launched into heliocentric orbit during the Falcon Heavy test flight.

See also

 Extraterrestrial intelligence
 Extraterrestrial (disambiguation)
 Alien (disambiguation)
 Spaceman (disambiguation)
 Star (disambiguation)
 Man (disambiguation)
 Airman